Liassoscorpionides is an extinct genus of scorpions from the Toarcian of Germany. It was found on the Posidonia Shale, on the so-called insect beds of Hondelage near Braunschweig, on a layer, as its name suggests, full of insect genera. Liassoscorpionides is the only confirmed jurassic scorpion discovered.

The holotype consists of a partial body fossil, measuring  14.4 mm in length and 4.8 mm in width. The preserved elements include a thin, short postabdomen (¼ metasoma), granulation of the carapace (¼ dorsal shield of the Prosoma), ornament on the posterior tergite margins resembling hatching, and a weak and delicate pedipalpal claw (supposedly superimposed from beneath the body). A median gut trace and a feature representing either a Runzelung (wrinkle) or a stigma (¼ spiracle) on the margin of at least the fifth Mesosomal segment was described, but its presence is controversial. Later, the original material was restudied and resolved numerous new features.

Being the only Jurassic scorpion known, there is no evidence that L. schmidti was aquatic (which was suggested in the past) and in the absence of further, better preserved material it should be excluded from future considerations of broad patterns of scorpion evolution. Some works consider it even a nomen dubium. With the spider Seppo koponeni is one of the two only known arachnids from the Lower Jurassic of Germany.

References 

Prehistoric scorpions
Prehistoric arachnid genera
Scorpion genera
Jurassic arthropods
Jurassic arachnids
Jurassic Germany
Fossils of Germany
Posidonia Shale
Fossil taxa described in 1951